Gainesville High School is the name of several high schools in the United States:

Gainesville High School (Florida)
Gainesville High School (Georgia)
Gainesville High School (Missouri), Gainesville, Missouri
Gainesville High School (Texas)
Gainesville High School (Virginia)